Mary Pat Gleason (February 23, 1950 – June 2, 2020) was an American film and television actress and an Emmy Award-winning writer. From 1983 to 1985, she appeared as "Jane Hogan" on the daytime soap opera Guiding Light, for which she was also a writer.

Life and career
Gleason was born in Lake City, Minnesota, the daughter of Mary Elizabeth (Kane) and Harold Clifford Gleason. During her high school years in St. Paul, Minnesota, she starred in a Theater St. Paul production of Once Upon a Mattress.

Her first screen role was the a 1982 episode of Texas, a soap opera that aired on NBC. She appeared on, among many others, such television series as Full House, Dear John, Murphy Brown, Empty Nest, L.A. Law, Saved by the Bell, Friends, and Step by Step. She appeared in more than 50 feature films, including I Now Pronounce You Chuck & Larry, Basic Instinct, Traffic, Bruce Almighty, 13 Going on 30, The Crucible, Bottle Shock, A Cinderella Story, The Island, Killing Kennedy, and Nina. In one of her last roles, she voiced Professor Foxtrot in CollegeHumor's animated web series WTF 101.

Writing
In addition to acting, Gleason also wrote for Guiding Light and was part of the team that won the 1986 Daytime Emmy  for outstanding daytime drama series writing.

Gleason became a vocal proponent of mental health treatment, and in 2006 wrote and starred in Stopping Traffic, a one-woman play about her struggles with bipolar disorder. The play is now used as a teaching aid for the Mayo Clinic's mental health programs.

Death
Gleason died of cancer on June 2, 2020, at age 70.

Filmography

Film

Television

Animation

Theater

Awards and nominations

References

External links

1950 births
2020 deaths
20th-century American actresses
21st-century American actresses
Actresses from Minnesota
American film actresses
American television actresses
People from Lake City, Minnesota
Place of death missing
Deaths from cancer in California
People with bipolar disorder